Micheleidae is a family of crustaceans belonging to the infraorder Axiidea, within the order Decapoda.

It contains the following genera:
 Marcusiaxius Rodrigues & de Carvalho, 1972
 Meticonaxius de Man, 1905
 Michelea Kensley & Heard, 1991
 Paki Karasawa & Hayakawa, 2000
 Tethisea Poore, 1994

References

Decapods